Robert McCarty Knapp (April 21, 1831 – June 24, 1889) was a U.S. Representative from Illinois, brother of Anthony Lausett Knapp.

Born in New York City, Knapp moved with his parents to Jerseyville, Illinois, in 1839.
He attended the common schools and the Kentucky Military Institute in Frankfort, Kentucky.
He studied law.
He was admitted to the bar in 1855 and commenced practice in Jerseyville.
He served as member of the Illinois House of Representatives in 1867.
He served as mayor of Jerseyville 1871-1876.

Knapp was elected as a Democrat to the Forty-third Congress (March 4, 1873 – March 3, 1875).
He was an unsuccessful candidate for reelection in 1874.

Knapp was elected to the Forty-fifth Congress (March 4, 1877 – March 3, 1879).
He was again an unsuccessful candidate for reelection in 1878.
He resumed the practice of law.
He died in Jerseyville, Illinois, June 24, 1889.
He was interred in Oak Grove Cemetery in Jerseyville.

References

External links
 

1831 births
1889 deaths
Democratic Party members of the Illinois House of Representatives
People from Jerseyville, Illinois
Democratic Party members of the United States House of Representatives from Illinois
19th-century American politicians